Madison County High School is a secondary school in Gurley, Alabama, United States.

History 
Grades K-12 were once located on the original campus in Gurley. In 1999 grades 9-12 were moved to a separate campus on Brock Road near US Highway 72. Madison County Elementary (K-8) still operates in the original location and buildings built in the 1930s. It was also eventually retired and another elementary and middle school were built.

Athletics 

The Madison County Tigers compete in Alabama High School Athletic Association class 4A. They field teams in baseball, basketball, cheerleading, wrestling, cross country, football, golf, soccer, softball, swimming, tennis, and track and field.

State championship titles held by the school include:
 Boys basketball: 2013 (4A)
 Girls volleyball 2012 (4A)
 Boys basketball: 2007 (4A)
 Boys Outdoor Track and Field: 1997 (4A)
 Boys Indoor Track and Field: 1999 (4A-5A)
 Boys Outdoor Track and Field: 1999 (4A)
 Girls Outdoor Track and Field: 1998 (4A)

Notable alumni 
 Jordan Chunn, NFL player

References

External links 
 Madison County High School

Public high schools in Alabama
Schools in Madison County, Alabama
School buildings completed in 1999
1999 establishments in Alabama